The men's 10 kilometre classical at the 2003 Asian Winter Games was held on February 2, 2003, at Ajara Athletic Park, Japan.

Schedule
All times are Japan Standard Time (UTC+09:00)

Results

References

Results FIS

External links
Results of the Fifth Winter Asian Games

Men 10